Michael Perry James (born August 18, 1990) is an American professional basketball player for AS Monaco Basket of LNB Pro A and the EuroLeague. He was a high school basketball standout playing for Grant High School in Portland, and played college basketball for Eastern Arizona College and Lamar University. He was the first player in NBA history to go from a two-way contract to a regular contract, all while never being sent down to the NBA G League in the process.

Early life and career
James was born and raised in Portland, Oregon. While in Portland, he played basketball for Grant High School under coach Tony Broadous. In 2007–08, as a senior, he was ranked the No. 3 Player in the state and No. 184 overall. He was also only recruited by Division III universities at the time. James averaged 15 points, 4 rebounds and 3 steals per game. The team went on to win the 2008 Oregon state championship, defeating Oregon City for it.

College career

Eastern Arizona College
James started his college career at Eastern Arizona College, a national junior college where he played under coach Maurice Leitzke. In his first year, he averaged 20 points per game shooting 42 percent overall, 33.3 percent from three-point range and 78 percent free throws. He was named all-conference and all-region teams as well as being ranked No. 40 best junior college player by Rivals.com. As a sophomore, he was the fourth leading scorer in the NJCAA Division I recording 26 points per game. In addition he contributed 5 rebounds, 4 assists and 2 steals.

Lamar University
In 2010, James transferred to a NCAA Division I school, Lamar University in Beaumont, Texas. Here he played under coach Steve Roccaforte in 2010–11 and under coach Pat Knight for the 2011–12 NCAA season. Playing a little over 18 minutes a game, he averaged 12.5 points, 2.4 rebounds, 1.8 assists and 1.1 steals. He led the team in scoring, even though he only started two out of twenty-four games for the season. He included a 52-point game on January 4, 2011 against Louisiana College, which Lamar Cardinals won 114–62, breaking the previous record of 50 set by Mike Oliver in 1980. In addition, he broke Lamar University's Montagne Center record for most points scored in a single game with 52, field goals made with 18, field goal attempts with 35, three-pointers made with 11 and three-pointer attempts with 21. In his senior season (2011–12), he averaged 17.1 points, 3.2 rebounds, 2 assists and 1.6 steals per game shooting 45.3 percent overall. One notable game of his was against the 2012 NCAA champion University of Kentucky, where he scored 29 points. His senior season ended in the first round of the 2012 NCAA tournament with a loss against Vermont. By the end of his season, he was named All-Southland First Team, Southland Tournament MVP and Southland Conference Player of the Week three times in four weeks. He had majored in general studies during his time there.

Professional career

Overseas career
In August 2012, James signed with Zagreb of Croatia for the 2012–13 season. In December 2012, he left Zagreb. In February 2013, he signed with Hapoel Galil Elyon of Israeli second tier league for the rest of the season.

In July 2013, James signed with Paffoni Omegna of Italy under their DNA Silver Basket league name for the 2013–14 season. That season, they finished in fourth place for the DNA Silver portion of the league.

In August 2014, James signed a one-year contract with Kolossos Rodou of Greece. On December 2, 2014, he left Kolossos and signed with the Spanish club Laboral Kutxa Baskonia of the Liga ACB for the rest of the season.

In July 2015, James joined the Phoenix Suns for the 2015 NBA Summer League. That same month, after a successful Summer League performance, he re-signed with Baskonia for one more season. During that season, Saski Baskonia would reach the EuroLeague Final Four, losing to the Fenerbahçe Ülker and the PBC Lokomotiv Kuban for a fourth-place performance.

On July 3, 2016, James signed with Panathinaikos in Greece for the 2016–17 season. That year saw him perform his best work in the EuroLeague yet. He helped the Panathinaikos win both the Greek Cup title and the Greek Basket League championship in the 2016–17 season. He was later named the Greek Basket League's Most Spectacular Player that year as well.

Phoenix Suns (2017)
On July 3, 2017, James signed with the Phoenix Suns and joined the team for the 2017 NBA Summer League. In the 2017 Summer League, he led the team in points and assists, averaging 20.5 points off of 53.8% shooting and 5.0 assists per game, as well as recording 5.2 rebounds and 1.8 steals in 33.2 minutes per game for the six games the Suns played during the event. James' contract with the team was a two-way affiliate deal, their first in franchise history. He also became the first player to sign a two-way contract in the NBA after spending multiple years overseas in international leagues. While James was eligible to split his time between Phoenix and their Northern Arizona Suns G League affiliate, he would never join the G League team during his two-way contract. James made his NBA debut on October 18, 2017, against the Portland Trail Blazers, recording 12 points that night. James became the first player to sign a two-way contract to also start with the team that signed him on, as he became the starting point guard on the October 23 game against the Sacramento Kings under interim head coach Jay Triano, recording 18 points and a team-high 7 assists in a 117–115 win. During his first four games of the season, James recorded at least 10 or more points with increased minute production in each game. On Halloween night, James recorded his first 20-point game with 24 points scored and four steals recorded in a 122–114 win over the Brooklyn Nets. On November 26, 2017, he scored a career-high 26 points in a 119–108 loss to the Minnesota Timberwolves. James would play his last game under his original two-way contract on December 5 against the Toronto Raptors, recording 10 points in a 126–113 loss. During this time, James would be considered the biggest success story to date revolving around the NBA's newest implemented system.

On December 7, 2017, James' contract with the Suns was converted to a one-year regular season deal, after Phoenix waived Derrick Jones Jr. However, on December 23, 2017, over two weeks after signing his one-year deal, James was waived by the Suns.

New Orleans Pelicans (2018)
On January 14, 2018, the New Orleans Pelicans signed James to a new two-way contract. Much like his tenure with Phoenix, James was never assigned to the NBA G League during his two-way contract with New Orleans. On February 10, 2018, he was waived by the Pelicans after appearing in four games.

Return to Panathinaikos
On February 13, 2018, Panathinaikos announced the return of James. He started the season playing shooting guard for the Greens, alongside Nick Calathes. On March 22, James scored the game winning shot with 5.8 seconds left against Maccabi Tel Aviv. He finished the game with 27 points.

Olimpia Milano (2018–2019)
On July 13, 2018, Olimpia Milano signed James to a multi-year contract. Over 30 games of the 2018–19 EuroLeague season, he averaged league-high 19.8 points, along with 6.8 assists and 3.8 rebounds per game. He won the Alphonso Ford Trophy, given to the top scorer of the EuroLeague.

But despite the statistically excellent season, the incoming Olimpia Milano coach, Ettore Messina, declared Mike James wouldn't be part of the 2019–20 team plans. James and the Italian team eventually reached an agreement and mutually parted ways on July 29, 2019.

CSKA Moscow (2019–2021)
On August 5, 2019, James signed a one-year contract with CSKA Moscow of the VTB United League and the EuroLeague. On June 1, 2020, he signed a three-year contract extension with CSKA. On April 21, 2021, he and CSKA came to an agreement that allowed the player to become a free agent until the end of the 2020–21 season. James averaged 19.3 points and 5.7 assist per game in the 2020–21 EuroLeague season. On September 11, 2021, James and the Russian club officially reached a buy-out agreement in order to terminate their mutual contract.

Brooklyn Nets (2021)
On April 23, 2021, James signed a 10-day contract with the Brooklyn Nets. On the same day of his signing, James debuted for the Nets against the Boston Celtics, logging eight points on 3-of-8 shooting from the field and 1-of-1 from three to go along with two rebounds and two assists across 21 minutes in a 109–104 win. On May 3, James signed a second 10-day contract with the Nets. On May 13, James was signed for the rest of the 2020–21 season.

Monaco (2021–present)
On September 17, 2021, James signed with AS Monaco Basket of the French LNB Pro A.

On March 14, 2023, Monaco indefinitely suspended James for an internal violation of team rules.

The Basketball Tournament
James has played for Team Maryland and Team Hines in The Basketball Tournament (TBT), an annual single-elimination winner-take-all tournament on ESPN. In two games with Team Maryland in TBT 2016, Mike James averaged 28.5 points, 4.0 assists, and 6.5 rebounds per game. James' most impressive outing was a 35-point, seven-rebound outburst in a 104–92 loss against Team Foe. Three years later in TBT 2019, James led Team Hines to the Semifinal Round where they lost to the Golden Eagles, 68–62. In five games, James averaged 16.4 points and 5.4 assists per game, while shooting 36.8 percent from the field.

Controversial comment
In early August 2022, James received media attention after making critical comments about NBA star Stephen Curry. James referred to Curry as being "one-dimensional" and negatively compared Curry to other NBA stars such as LeBron James, Kevin Durant, Joel Embiid, Giannis Antetokounmpo and Luka Dončić. Curry himself later jokingly referred to the "one-dimensional" jab from James while talking with the media at a basketball camp he was hosting for elite high school players.

Career statistics

EuroLeague

|-
| style="text-align:left;"|2014–15
| style="text-align:left;" rowspan="2"|Baskonia
| 16 || 6 || 19.2 || .404 || .222 || .844 || 2.4 || 1.9 || 1.1 || .0 || 11.1 || 8.0
|-
| style="text-align:left;"|2015–16
| 29 || 0 || 21.2 || .424 || .368 || .864 || 2.6 || 2.7 || .6 || .1 || 10.0 || 10.1
|-
| style="text-align:left;"|2016–17
| style="text-align:left;" rowspan="2"|Panathinaikos
| 25 || 1 || 22.7 || .486|| .340 || .688 || 2.2 || 3.0 || .9 || .1 || 13.1 || 13.1
|-
| style="text-align:left;"|2017–18
| 12 || 11 || 25.3 || .478 || .242 || .707 || 2.8 || 4.1 || 1.3 || .1 || 16.2 || 15.7
|- 
| style="text-align:left;"|2018–19
| style="text-align:left;"|Milano
| 30 || 30 || style="background:#cfecec;"|33.9 || .404 || .326 || .826 || 3.8 || 6.4 || 1.3 || .0 || style="background:#cfecec;"|19.8 || style="background:#cfecec;"|20.2
|- 
| style="text-align:left;"|2019–20
| style="text-align:left;" rowspan="2"|CSKA Moscow
| 28 || 25 || 28.6 || .440 || .420 || .833 || 3.3 || 4.3 || .7 || .6 || 21.1 || 20.9
|-
| style="text-align:left;"|2020–21
| 27 || 16 || 31.1 || .511 || .354 || .814 || 3.1 || 5.7 || 1.0 || .8 || 19.3 || 19.7
|-
| style="text-align:left;"|2021–22
| style="text-align:left;"|AS Monaco
| 38 || 32 || 31.2 || .494 || .313 || .833 || 3.2 || 5.8 || 1.2 || .4 || 16.4 || 18.1
|- class="sortbottom"
| style="text-align:center;" colspan="2"|Career
| 205 || 121 || 27.5 || .502 || .338 || .814 || 3.0 || 4.5 || 1.0 || .5 || 16.2 || 16.3

NBA

Regular season

|-
| style="text-align:left;"|
| style="text-align:left;"|Phoenix
| 32 || 10 || 20.9 || .388 || .268 || .762 || 2.8 || 3.8 || .8 || .2 || 10.4
|-
| style="text-align:left;"|
| style="text-align:left;"|New Orleans
| 4 || 0 || 4.5 || .222 || .000 ||  || .3 || 1.5 || .3 || .0 || 1.0
|-
| style="text-align:left;"|
| style="text-align:left;"|Brooklyn
| 13 || 1 || 18.2 || .370 || .355 || .778 || 2.4 || 4.2 || .5 || .1 || 7.7
|- class="sortbottom"
| style="text-align:center;" colspan="2"|Career
| 49 || 11 || 18.8 || .383 || .265 || .762 || 2.5 || 3.5 || .8 || .2 || 8.9

Playoffs

|-
| style="text-align:left;"|2021
| style="text-align:left;"|Brooklyn
| 9 || 0 || 11.4 || .326 || .313 ||  || 1.8 || 1.3 || .2 || .0 || 3.7
|- class="sortbottom"
| style="text-align:center;" colspan="2"|Career
| 9 || 0 || 11.4 || .326 || .313 ||  || 1.8 || 1.3 || .2 || .0 || 3.7

References

External links

 Lamar Cardinals bio
 Mike James at acb.com 
 Mike James at esake.gr 
 Mike James at euroleague.net

1990 births
Living people
American expatriate basketball people in Croatia
American expatriate basketball people in Greece
American expatriate basketball people in Israel
American expatriate basketball people in Italy
American expatriate basketball people in Russia
American expatriate basketball people in Spain
American men's basketball players
AS Monaco Basket players
Basketball players from Portland, Oregon
Brooklyn Nets players
Eastern Arizona Gila Monsters men's basketball players
Grant High School (Portland, Oregon) alumni
Hapoel Galil Elyon players
KK Zagreb players
Kolossos Rodou B.C. players
Lamar Cardinals basketball players
Lega Basket Serie A players
Liga ACB players
New Orleans Pelicans players
Olimpia Milano players
Panathinaikos B.C. players
PBC CSKA Moscow players
Phoenix Suns players
Point guards
Saski Baskonia players
Undrafted National Basketball Association players